Claude Ramey (29 October 17544 June 1838) was a French sculptor.

Life
Ramey was born in Dijon and received his art training in the École de Dessin in that city under François Devosge. He then went to Paris and studied Sculpture with Étienne-Pierre-Adrien Gois. In 1782, he won the Prix de Rome and was subsequently a pensionnaire at the French Academy in Rome from 1782 to 1786.

Between 1806 and 1810 he was engaged on the bas reliefs on the Vendôme Column in Paris. In 1817, he was elected to the Academie des Beaux Arts; amongst his students was Jean-Pierre Cortot. In 1828, he produced a monumental statue of Cardinal Richelieu which was installed at Richelieu, Indre-et-Loire.

Ramey died in Paris in June 1838. He was the father of Étienne-Jules Ramey (1796–1852), also a sculptor.

Works
Napoléon I in coronation robes (Paris, Louvre Museum).
Napoleon I evokes Minerva, Mercury and the deities of Peace etc (1811, relief, Louvre Museum).Sappho (1801, marble statue, Louvre Museum).L'Entrevue de Tilsit (marble bas-relief, Paris, Arc de Triomphe du Carrousel.Naiad (statue, Medici Fountain, Paris, Jardin du Luxembourg).Eugène de Beauharnais, Viceroy of (1781-1824) (1810, marble statue, Palace of Versailles).Cardinal Richelieu (1828, Marble statue at Place Aristide-Briand, Richelieu (Indre-et-Loire).Minerve instruisant la jeunesse'' (1787, terracotta, Musée de la Révolution française)

Gallery

References

This article incorporates text from the French Wikipedia, Claude Ramey.

1754 births
1838 deaths
Artists from Dijon
18th-century French sculptors
French male sculptors
19th-century French sculptors
Prix de Rome for sculpture
Members of the Académie des beaux-arts
Burials at Montparnasse Cemetery
19th-century French male artists
18th-century French male artists